Exchangeable may refer to:

 Exchangeable batteries, used with battery swapping in charging stations
 Exchangeable bond, a type of hybrid security
 Exchangeable image file format (Exif), a specification for the image file format used by digital cameras
 Exchangeable random variables, in statistics, a set of random variables whose joint distribution is the same irrespective of the order of the variables

See also